

Qualification system
A total of 205 rowers will qualify to compete at the games. A country may only enter a maximum of 26 rowers. All qualification was done at the 2014 Pan American Olympic Festival, where a specific number of boats qualified in each of the fourteen events (except the men's eights which will be by entry only). The host nation (Canada) and the United States were granted automatic qualification in all the events. Any remaining athlete quota spots after teams are selected, will be redistributed to fill the maximum quota.

Qualification timeline

Qualification summary

The maximum allowed is 209 athletes, but some athletes will double up which means a total of much less than 209.

Men's events

Single sculls

Double sculls

Quadruple sculls

Pairs

Fours

Eights

Lightweight double sculls

Lightweight fours

Women's events

Single sculls

Double sculls

Quadruple sculls

Pairs

Lightweight single sculls

Lightweight double sculls

References

External links
Pan American Olympic Festival results

P
Qualification for the 2015 Pan American Games
Rowing at the 2015 Pan American Games